Martha Carr (born December 15, 1972) is a politician in Ontario, Canada. She is the city councillor for Alta Vista Ward on Ottawa City Council.

Background
Carr was born in 1972 to parents Russell and Susan, and grew up in Prince Edward County. In grade 5, she moved to Edmonton and would attend the University of Alberta, where she received a Bachelor's in French. She then attended Université Laval where she received a Master's in Linguistics in French. While a student at Laval, she met her husband Christian. She moved to Ottawa in 1999, settling in the Alta Vista area in 2004.

Prior to being elected, Carr was a director in the Department of Justice. She also served the president of the Alta Vista Community Association for almost four years. Carr previously worked for the Canada Border Services Agency.

Politics
Carr was elected on a platform of road repairs, keeping community facilities up-to-date, fixing transit routes, improving active transportation connectivity and roads, and boosting the ward's tree canopy.

Electoral record

|-
!rowspan="2" colspan="2"|Candidate
!colspan="3"|Popular vote
!rowspan="2" colspan="2"|Expenditures
|-
! Votes
! %
! ±%
|-
| style="background-color:#008080;" |
| style="text-align:left;"  | Marty Carr
| style="text-align:right;" | 6,088
| style="text-align:right;" | 47.12
| style="text-align:right;" | –
| style="text-align:right;" |
|-
| style="background-color:#0E1D62;" |
| style="text-align:left;"  | Carolyn Kropp
| style="text-align:right;" | 4,107
| style="text-align:right;" | 31.79
| style="text-align:right;" | –
| style="text-align:right;" |
|-
| style="background-color:#c63a3d;" |
| style="text-align:left;"  | Bob Perkins
| style="text-align:right;" | 2,453
| style="text-align:right;" | 18.99
| style="text-align:right;" | –
| style="text-align:right;" |
|-
| style="background-color:#09081a;" |
| style="text-align:left;"  | Angelo Gino Scaffidi
| style="text-align:right;" | 271
| style="text-align:right;" | 2.10
| style="text-align:right;" | –
| style="text-align:right;" |
|-
| style="text-align:right;background-color:#FFFFFF;" colspan="2" |Total valid votes
| style="text-align:right;background-color:#FFFFFF;" | 12,919
| style="text-align:right;background-color:#FFFFFF;" | 96.70
| style="text-align:right;background-color:#c2c2c2;" colspan="2" |
|-
| style="text-align:right;background-color:#FFFFFF;" colspan="2" |Total rejected, unmarked and declined votes
| style="text-align:right;background-color:#FFFFFF;" | 441
| style="text-align:right;background-color:#FFFFFF;" | 3.30
| style="text-align:right;background-color:#c2c2c2;" colspan="2" |
|-
| style="text-align:right;background-color:#FFFFFF;" colspan="2" |Turnout
| style="text-align:right;background-color:#FFFFFF;" | 13,360
| style="text-align:right;background-color:#FFFFFF;" | 43.09
| style="text-align:right;background-color:#FFFFFF;" |
| style="text-align:right;background-color:#c2c2c2;" |
|- 
| style="text-align:right;background-color:#FFFFFF;" colspan="2" |Eligible voters
| style="text-align:right;background-color:#FFFFFF;" | 31,008
| style="text-align:right;background-color:#c2c2c2;" colspan="3" |
|- 
| style="text-align:left;" colspan="6" |Note: Candidate campaign colours are based on the prominent colour used in campaign items (signs, literature, etc.)and are used as a visual differentiation between candidates.
|- 
| style="text-align:left;" colspan="13" |Sources:
|}

|-
! bgcolor="#DDDDFF" width="200px" | Zone 6
! bgcolor="#DDDDFF" width="50px" | Vote
! bgcolor="#DDDDFF" width="30px" | %
|-
| Chris Ellis (X) || 5,883 || 48.28 
|-
| Marty Carr || 4,216 || 34.60 
|-
| Tanya Melissa Dasilva || 2,085 || 17.11 
|-
|}

References

Living people
Ottawa city councillors
Women municipal councillors in Canada
21st-century Canadian women politicians
University of Alberta alumni
Université Laval alumni
1972 births
People from Prince Edward County, Ontario